HMS Vernon was a shore establishment or "stone frigate" of the Royal Navy in Portsmouth. Vernon was established on 26 April 1876 as the Royal Navy's Torpedo Branch also known as the Torpedo School, named after the ship  which served as part of its floating base. After the First World War, HMS Vernon moved ashore, taking over the Gunwharf site, where it continued to operate until 1 April 1996, when the various elements comprising the establishment were split up and moved to different commands.

Foundation and early history
The second ship to be called  ended her career laid up in Chatham Dockyard as a floating coaling jetty. Vesuvius was attached as an Experimental Tender for the conduct of torpedo trials, and remained in the role until 1923.

On 26 April 1876 Vernon was joined by the former steam frigate  and the lighter Florence Nightingale. These were then commissioned as HMS Vernon, and became the home of the Royal Navy's Torpedo Branch, independent of HMS Excellent. Ariadne was used to provide accommodation. In January 1886  replaced the original Vernon as a more spacious torpedo school ship. Donegal was renamed Vernon, the original Vernon was renamed Actaeon and took over as the practical workshop.

On 23 April 1895 the hulks were moved to Portchester Creek. Ariadne was replaced as an accommodation hulk by the old , which was renamed Vernon II and was connected by bridges to Actaeon and Vernon, jointly named Vernon I. In 1904  joined the establishment as a floating workshop, power plant and wireless telegraphy school, renamed Vernon III. Meanwhile, Actaeon was renamed Vernon IV. Also in 1904 Ariadne was detached and sent to Sheerness to be used to establish a new torpedo school. She was renamed Actaeon in 1905.

In wartime and onshore

On the outbreak of the First World War, Vernon was used to carry out torpedo trials and to train new recruits for the Navy. Extensive research and development was also carried to develop new anti-submarine devices, mines and ships' electrics. In September 1917 as part of the Signal School, a DCB Section was established to develop Radio Control for unmanned vessels from 'mother' aircraft.

On 1 October 1923 Vernon was moved ashore and new departments were set up to cover aspects of maritime warfare, such as mining, torpedoes and electrical equipment. The names of the original hulks that made up the floating Vernon were used for buildings in the base. Their Chief Scientist from the beginning (probably coming from off-shore research) was Prof Edward Philip Harrison FRSE, who remained in charge until 1937. doing much to progress the advancement of magnetic mines.

In the Second World War, and following on from the increasing use of mines, Vernon took on responsibility for mine disposal and developing mine countermeasures. The staff were able to capture a number of enemy mines and develop successful countermeasures. A number of officers working with Vernon were awarded Distinguished Service Orders for their successes in capturing new types of mine. One of these was Lieutenant Commander John Ouvry who defuzed the first intact German magnetic mine recovered by the Allies. It had been accidentally dropped by the Luftwaffe on the sands at Shoeburyness. The incident formed an important part of an episode of The Secret War, a BBC and Imperial War Museum production.

The Germans began placing booby traps in some mines to counter attempts by Vernon's staff to capture them. One exploded in a mining shed at Vernon on 6 August 1940, killing an officer and four ratings and seriously injuring a number of other personnel. To avoid a repetition of this, a nearby disused quarry, nicknamed HMS Mirtle (short for Mine Investigation Range), was used for examining mines.

Portsmouth suffered heavy air raids during the war, with Vernon being hit several times. One bomb demolished Dido Building and killed 100 people. Subsequently, sections of Vernon were dispersed to quieter areas. On 3 May 1941 most departments of Vernon were moved to Roedean School at Brighton, which was known as HMS Vernon (R), whilst other elements were relocated elsewhere on the south coast and further away.

On 1 October 1944 responsibility for naval diving passed from the Gunnery Branch, at HMS Excellent, to the Torpedo Branch, at Vernon. A new diving school known as Vernon(D) was established at Brixham on 27 October 1944, with administrative support in Dartmouth. The Brixham base was later joined by the Admiralty Experimental Diving Unit (AEDU) and the Deep Diving Tender . The unit remained at Brixham until 1 October 1945 when it returned to the main HMS Vernon at Portsmouth.

Postwar devolution and decommissioning

On 10 October 1946 the recently formed Electrical Branch took over responsibility for Electrical Operations from Vernon, whilst Vernon merged with the Anti-Submarine Branch, which had been based at HMS Osprey at Portland. The merger resulted in the formation of the Torpedo and Anti-Submarine (TAS) Branch, which assumed responsibility for naval diving. The TAS Branch remained at Vernon until mid 1974, when it was moved to become part of  prior to the formation of the Operations Branch the following year. Vernon housed the RN Diving School, training Clearance Divers for the Fleet Clearance diving teams and minehunters. The establishment was also the home of the "Dunker" Helicopter and Fixed Wing Aircraft Escape Training, until a new facility was opened at RNAS Yeovilton (HMS Heron).

Vernon ceased to be an independent command on 31 March 1986, when it was renamed HMS Nelson (Vernon Site), and in 1987 it was renamed HMS Nelson (Gunwharf) It became the Headquarters for the Commandant General Royal Marines for a brief period, and continued to be used for training. Mine warfare training was moved to the School of Maritime Operations (SMOPS), now part of HMS Dryad, in November 1995. The final element of the old Vernon, the diving school, was moved onto new premises on Horsea Island and Vernon ceased to exist. The figurehead of the original HMS Vernon is preserved in Portsmouth.

Captains of the Torpedo School
Included:
 Captain William Arthur, April 1876 – June 1879
 Captain William E. Gordon, June 1879 – February 1883
 Captain Albert Hastings Markham, February 1883 – May 1886
 Captain Samuel Long, May 1886 – January 1889
 Captain Arthur K. Wilson, January 1889 – February 1892
 Captain William H. Hall, February 1892 – November 1893
 Captain Sir Baldwin Wake-Walker, Bt, November 1893 – November 1895
 Captain John Durnford, November 1895 – October 1899
 Captain Charles G. Robinson, October 1899 – February 1902
 Captain George le C. Egerton, February 1902 – September 1904
 Captain Henry B. Jackson, September – December 1904
 Captain Charles J. Briggs, December 1904 – May 1907
 Captain Douglas A. Gamble, May 1907 – October 1908
 Captain Robert S. Phipps Hornby, October 1908 – November 1911
 Captain William C. M. Nicholson, November 1911 – September 1914
 Captain Frederick L. Field, September 1914 – September 1915
 Captain Harry L. d'E. Skipwith, September 1915 – July 1918
 Captain Frederick C. U. Vernon-Wentworth, July 1918 – March 1919
 Captain Arthur K. Waistell, March 1919 – April 1920
 Captain Christopher R. Payne, April 1920 – April 1922
 Captain John Derwent Allen, April 1922 – November 1924
 Captain Henry K. Kitson, November 1924 – November 1926
 Captain Nicholas E. Archdale, November 1926 – November 1928
 Captain Henry D. Bridges, November 1928 – November 1930
 Captain Stephen D. Tillard, November 1930 – August 1932
 Captain Alfred H. Taylor, August 1932 – August 1934
 Captain Roderick B. T. Miles, August 1934 – September 1935
 Captain Algernon U. Willis, September 1935 – April 1938
 Captain Denis W. Boyd, April 1938 – December 1939
 Rear-Admiral Brian Egerton, December 1939 – June 1943
 Captain Harold E. Morse, June 1943 – September 1944
 Captain Norman V. Grace, September 1944 – January 1946
 Captain John Hughes-Hallett, January 1946 – May 1948
 Captain Wilfrid J. C. Robertson, May 1948 – August 1950
 Captain Clarence D. Howard-Johnston, August 1950 – October 1952
 Captain Nicholas A. Copeman, October 1952 – December 1954
 Captain John Grant, December 1954 – December 1956
 Captain Edward A. Blundell, December 1956 – February 1959 
 Captain Morgan C. Giles, February 1959 – January 1961
 Captain Hardress L. Lloyd, January 1961 – April 1963
 Captain Douglas M. H. Stobie, April 1963 – June 1965
 Captain Robert E. Lloyd, June 1965 – July 1967
 Captain William P. B. Barber, July 1967 – April 1969
 Captain Thomas K. Edge-Partington, April 1969 – October 1970
 Captain Stuart M.W. Farquharson-Roberts, October 1970 – November 1972
 Captain Robert S. Browning, November 1972 – July 1974
 Captain Geoffrey D. Trist, July 1974 – July 1976
 Captain Edward M. S. O’Kelly, July 1976 – August 1978
 Captain Stuart K. Sutherland, August 1978 – December 1980
 Captain George Oxley, December 1980 – March 1983
 Captain Jonathan D. W. Husband, March 1983 – 1986

See also
List of Royal Navy shore establishments
Gunwharf Quays
Admiralty Mining Establishment

References
Notes

Sources

History of HMS Vernon
HMS Vernon at the Girls' School
HMS Vernon's figurehead
 Mackie, Colin. (2017), Senior Royal Navy Appointments from 1865. Captain, Torpedo School. “HMS Vernon”. from 1876 until 1986, http://www.gulabin.com/ pp. 258–259.

External links
 

Royal Navy bases in Hampshire
Royal Navy shore establishments